Adam Street railway station, was a railway station in Cardiff, and was one of the original termini of the Rhymney Railway, it was opened on 31 March 1858, but was closed to passengers on 1 April 1871, being replaced by the nearby Cardiff Crockherbtown railway station when the Rhymney Railway opened its own route into Cardiff. It remained open as a goods station until 2 May 1966.

References

Disused railway stations in Cardiff
Former Rhymney Railway stations
Railway stations in Great Britain opened in 1858
Railway stations in Great Britain closed in 1871